Krishna Dhar, (1 February 1928 - 12 October 2022) was an Indian poet, playwright, writer, journalist, columnist and teacher. He has written poetry alongside verse drama, nonfictional prose of varied nature and journalistic columns since the mid 1940s.

Early life, education and last days 
The Dhar family originated in Kamalpur village of Kishorganj, now in the Dhaka Division, earlier Mohkuma (মহকুমা) under the Mymensingh District, in Bangladesh. Krishna Dhar is the second of the seven children born to the late Chinmoyee Dhar and the late Upendra Chandra Dhar. His father was a legal practitioner in the court at Bajitpur, a nearby town. His forefathers adopted and developed a reasonably uninhibited, unorthodox lifestyle of nineteenth century Bengal which, in turn, formed the basis of their family tradition.  Krishna Dhar spent his formative years as a child at Kamalpur where he took his primary education at a village school or pathsala. For his high school education, he shifted to his father's work place at Bajitpur.  After his matriculation in 1943 from Bajitpur H. E. School, Kishorganj and Intermediate at Feni College, Brahmanbaria (1943-1945), Dhar went on to study at Scottish Church College, Kolkata(1945-1947) and subsequently got his master's degree in Bengali literature from Calcutta University in 1949.
For the last few years of his life, he was staying with his youngest daughter Smt. Suranjana Chaudhury. He breathed his last on October 12, 2022 in a private nursing home in Kolkata.

Career 
He started his professional career by teaching undergraduate students at Deshbandhu Girls' College, Kolkata while simultaneously writing features for Bengali newspapers. In 1950-51 he quit his teaching position to join Jugantar, a Bengali daily in 1952 as sub editor, and subsequently became the assistant editor of the daily. He continued in Jugantar for the next 35 years and retired from the daily as editor. In 1990, he joined Dainik Basumati, another Bengali daily, as editor until his retirement in 1992. In this period Dhar also had numerous teaching assignments, focusing primarily on journalism, at Surendranath College, Burdwan University, and Calcultta University.

Literary career 
Dhar published his first book of poem, Angikar, in 1948. Spanning over a period of seventy five years, his socially sensitive, humanist and aesthetic poems, verse dramas, and prolific prose continue to appeal and enthrall his readers.

Poetry 

 Angikar, Sanskriti Prakashani (1948)
 Jakhon Pratham Dhorechey Koli, Galpo Bhavan, Kolkata (1955)
 E Jonmer Nayak, Pratibha Prakashani, Kolkata (1962)
 Amar Hatey Rokto, Anubhab Prakashani, Kolkata (1967)
 Kaler Nisargo Drishyo, Anubhab Prakashani, Kolkata (1968)
 Duhsamay Kobitar Lekhoker Kachey, Shuksari Prakashak, Kolkata (1970)
 Kaler Rakhal Tumi Vietnam, Shankar Prakashan, Kolkata (1972)
 Je Jekhane Acho, Saraswat Library, Kolkata (1976)
 Shabdohin Shobhajatra, Shaibya Pustakalaya, Kolkata (1981)
 Hey Samay hey Sandhikshan, Roibatak, Kolkata (1991)
 Nirbachito Kabita, Saraswat Library, Kolkata (1996)
 Priyo Bak Katha Rakho, Shristi Prakashan (2001)
 Gangchiler Swapno O Satranga Ramdhanu, Ishkra, Kolkata (2005)
 Hantbo Thambona, Balark, Kolkata (2008)
 Jonakporee Homapakhi, Chotoder Kochipata, Kolkata (2008)
 Shrestho Kabita, Ekush Shatak, Kolkata (2016)
 Kabita Samagraha, Sarango Prakashani, Kolkata (2019)

Verse drama 
 Padadhwani Palatak, Saraswat Library, Kolkata (1974)
 Biruddho Batas, Dey Book Store, Kolkata (1989) 
 Payer Shabdo Shona Jay, Swabhumi, Kolkata (1994)
 Jege Acho Barnamala, Krandasi Sahitya Patra, Kolkata (1996)
 Prachhadey Legeche Dhulo, Ishkara, Kolkata (2004)
 Nirbachita Kabyanatak, Saraswat Library, Kolkata (1984). Includes, Ek Ratrir Jonyo, Bodhyobhumitey Basarghar, Padadhwani Palatak, Nihato Godhuli, Andhokare Juin Phuler Gandho,Batighar.
 Kabyanatak Samgraha Pashchimbanga Bangla Akademi, Kolkata (2009) . Includes, Bhorer Manushera, Sindhuparer Pakhi, Ami Nachiketa, Dana, Abhimanyu, Jege Acho Barnamala, Khorkuto, Biruddho Batas, Bikeler Baranda Periye, Payer Shabdo Shona Jay, Prachhadey Legeche Dhulo, Keya Phuler Gandho, Padadhwani Kar, Jai Utser Dikey,  Ektai Jibon, Naditeyi Pratik, Golaper Juddho, Ghare Ferar Din, Jodiyo Sandhya, Pahar Dekechilo, Hey Samoy he Sandhikhon, Nihoto Godhuli, Badhyo Bhumitey Basarghar, Karun Rangin Path, Andhokare Juiphuler Gandho, Banojyotsna, Samabeto Karatali, Batighar, Padadhwani Palatak.

Unpublished staged verse drama 
Phoolwali by Gandharva Natyagoshthee (1968/1969).

Travelogue 
 Moscow theke Phera, Bak Sahitya Pvt. Ltd., Kolkata (1974)
 Anya Desh Anya Nagar, Popular Library, Kolkata (1981)

Memoirs 
 At dashak Sat Kahan, Prativash, Kolkata (2016) 
 Jhanki Darshan, Ekush Satak, Kolkata (2019)

Non-fiction 
 Boi Paruyar Dekha Manush, Ekush Satak, Kolkata (2014)

Fiction 
 Purano Akharguli, The Shee Book Agency, Kolkata (2013)

On Literature 
 Adhunik Kabitar Utsa, Anubhab Prakashani, Kolkata (1969)
 Sahityer Sajghar, Ekush Satak, Kolkata (2015)

Journalism 
 Sangbatikatar Darshan: Adarsha O Bichyuti (First edn. 2003, Second edn. 2015), Prativash, Kolkata

Writings on historical perspectives 
 Muktijuddhe Bangladesh, Shankar Prakashan, Kolkata (1971)
 Kolkata Teen Shatak (First edn. 1989, Second edn. 1994), Pashchimbanga Bangla Academy, Govt. of West Bengal
 Bharater Mukti Sangramey Bangla, Department of Information and Culture, Govt. of West Bengal. (1997)

Biography 
 Deshnayak Subhash (First edn. 1997, Second edn. 2007), Pashchimbanga Bangla Academy,  
 Sangrami Sampadak Vivekananda Mukhopadhyay, National Book Trust, (2007)

Personal life 
Wife: Late Kalpana Dhar (nee Nag) Married: 1950, Died: 2009.

Children: Nilanjana Choudhuri (born: 1952), Suranjana Chaudhury (born: 1965).

Pen Names 
Mallinath, Bidur, Anyadarshi

Prizes and felicitations 
Sudha Basu Puraskar from Calcutta University, Poetry India Prize, Sisir Kumar Puraskar, Gauri Ghosal Smriti Puraskar, Tribritta Puraskar, Nazrul Puraskar given by Paschimbanga Bangla Akademi, Sarong Argha Nibedan from Sarong Literary Magazine, Great Bengal Purashkar, Amrita Purashkar, Muzaffar Ahmed Smriti Puraskar.

References 

Bengali poets
1928 births
Bengali Hindus
Bengali writers
20th-century Bengalis
Living people
Writers from West Bengal
Novelists from West Bengal
Indian male writers
20th-century Indian writers
20th-century Indian male writers
Indian biographers
Indian historical novelists
Indian columnists
Indian poets
Indian male poets
20th-century Indian poets
Indian dramatists and playwrights
Indian male dramatists and playwrights
20th-century Indian dramatists and playwrights
Indian journalists
Indian male journalists
20th-century Indian journalists
Indian newspaper journalists
Indian editors
Indian newspaper editors
Indian schoolteachers
Indian travel writers
Indian memoirists
Indian non-fiction writers
Indian male non-fiction writers
20th-century Indian non-fiction writers
Indian literary historians